Donegal North-East was a parliamentary constituency represented in Dáil Éireann, the lower house of the Irish parliament or Oireachtas, from 1961 to 1977 and from 1981 to 2016. The constituency elected 3 deputies (Teachtaí Dála, commonly known as TDs). The method of election was proportional representation by means of the single transferable vote (PR-STV).

History
The constituency was first created for the 1961 general election, taking in parts of the abolished Donegal East constituency. It lasted until 1977, when it was abolished and became part of a new Donegal constituency, and was then recreated for the 1981 general election. It was abolished at the 2016 general election, and again became part of the re-created Donegal constituency.

Boundaries
The constituency was located in the northern part of County Donegal. It encompassed the Letterkenny, Milford and Inishowen electoral areas of Donegal County Council.

The Electoral (Amendment) Act 2009 defined the constituency as:

"In the county of Donegal the electoral divisions of:

Ardmalin, Ballyliffin, Birdstown, Buncrana Rural, Burt, Carndonagh, Carthage, Castlecary, Castleforward, Culdaff, Desertegny, Dunaff, Fahan, Glenagannon, Gleneely, Glentogher, Greencastle, Illies, Inch Island, Kilderry, Killea, Malin, Mintiaghs, Moville, Newtown Cunningham, Redcastle, Straid, Three Trees, Turmone, Whitecastle, in the former Rural District of Inishowen;

Ballymacool, Castlewray, Corravaddy, Edenacarnan, Gartán, Gortnavern, Killymasny, Kincraigy, Letterkenny Rural, Magheraboy, Manorcunningham, Mín an Lábáin, Suí Corr, Templedouglas, in the former Rural District of Letterkenny;

An Cheathrú Chaol, An Tearmann, Ballyarr, Carraig Airt, Cnoc Colbha, Creamhghort, Fánaid Thiar, Fánaid Thuaidh, Glen, Glenalla, Grianfort, Killygarvan, Kilmacrenan, Loch Caol, Millford, Rathmelton, Rathmullan, Ros Goill, Rosnakill, in the former Rural District of Millford;

and the towns of Buncrana and Letterkenny."

TDs

TDs 1969–1977

TDs 1981–2016

Elections

2011 general election

2007 general election

2002 general election

1997 general election

1996 by-election
Following the death of Independent Fianna Fáil TD Neil Blaney, a by-election was held on 2 April 1996. It was won by the Fianna Fáil candidate Cecilia Keaveney.

1992 general election

1989 general election

1987 general election

November 1982 general election

February 1982 general election
Unusually, all seats were filled on the first count. A further two counts were then held to give lower-placed candidates a chance to save their deposits.

1981 general election

1976 by-election
Following the death of Fianna Fáil TD Liam Cunningham, a by-election was held on 10 June 1976. The seat was won by the Independent Fianna Fáil candidate Paddy Keaveney.

1973 general election

1969 general election

1965 general election

1961 general election

See also
Dáil constituencies
Politics of the Republic of Ireland
Historic Dáil constituencies
Elections in the Republic of Ireland

References

External links
Oireachtas Members Database

Dáil constituencies in the Republic of Ireland (historic)
1961 establishments in Ireland
1977 disestablishments in Ireland
Constituencies established in 1961
Constituencies disestablished in 1977
1981 establishments in Ireland
Constituencies established in 1981
2016 disestablishments in Ireland
Constituencies disestablished in 2016
Historic constituencies in County Donegal